Kuneru is a village in Vizianagaram district of the Indian state of Andhra Pradesh.  Nagavali River and one of its tributaries converge at the village. The village is peaceful with much greenery, as well as being eco-friendly. It has little development.

Transport
Kuneru railway station is located on Vizianagaram–Raipur mainline in East Coast Railway zone of Indian Railways.

On 21 January 2017, the Hirakhand Express 18448 derailed near Kuneru resulting in at least 39 deaths and more than 200 injuries.

References

Villages in Vizianagaram district